In the Third battle of Elephant Pass, Elephant Pass was recaptured from the Tamil Tigers by the armed forces of the Sri Lankan Army.

Mahinda Rajapaksa, the president of Sri Lanka, declared that Elephant Pass was captured by the army on January 9, 2009.

Conflict

The base got overrun by the LTTE at the end of the Second Battle of Elephant Pass during the third 
Eelam War. The base was a stronghold for LTTE until it was recaptured.

Elephant Pass
Elephant Pass
2009 in Sri Lanka
January 2009 events in Asia